The Faculty of Life Sciences at the University of Copenhagen operated from 2007 to 2012 and was located in Frederiksberg, Denmark.

History
The faculty was previously known as the Royal Veterinary and Agricultural University, which was established in 1856. On January 1, 2007, The Royal Veterinary and Agricultural University was merged into the University of Copenhagen and was renamed as the Faculty of Life Sciences. On January 1, 2012, the Faculty of Life Sciences was split up. The veterinary part was merged into the Faculty of Health and Medical Sciences and the rest was merged into the Faculty of Science.

Det Biovidenskabelige Fakultets Have

Det Biovidenskabelige Fakultets Have (commonly known as Haven) is a botanical garden which lies on Bülowsvej in Frederiksberg and belongs to the University of Copenhagen Faculty of Life Sciences The garden is a research and study garden for researchers and students. However, there is also public access, and the garden contains flowering trees and bushes all year round.

The garden was opened in 1858 under the name "Landbohøjskolens Have" at the same time as the Kgl. Veterinær- og Landbohøjskole was built, and the central part with a small pond and hanging garden has remained unchanged since then. 

Many of the large trees are therefore 140 years old. The gardens' largest tree is a beech with a circumference of 5 metres. The garden has over  different plants, all of which has nameplates. The garden has a rose garden from 1929, which was planted by Georg Georgsen and contains hundreds of large-flowered and historic roses. 

In contrast with University of Copenhagen Botanical Garden – which mainly contains wild plants - the emphasis here is on plants which are usually shown in gardens and parks.

References

External links
Faculty of Life Sciences
Buildings 
Det Biovidenskabelige Fakultets Have's homepage

Copenhagen